Megachile pillaultae is a species of bee in the family Megachilidae. It was described by Pasteels in 1978.

References

Pillaultae
Insects described in 1978